Antigonia may refer to:

Places
 Antigonia (Chaonia), near Saraqinisht, southern Albania
 Archaeological National park of Antigonea
 Antigonia (Paeonia), in Paeonia, Macedon
 Antigonia Psaphara, in Crucis, Chalcidice, Greece
 Antigonia (Syria), in Seleucis, Syria, now near Antakya, Hatay Province, Turkey
 Alexandria Troas or Antigonia, in Troas, Asia Minor, now Eski Stambul, Çanakkale Province, Turkey
 Diocese of Antigonia, a former see in the Roman province Hellespontus
 Nicaea or Antigonia, Bithynia, now İznik, Bursa Province, Turkey
 Mantinea or Antigonia, Arcadia, Greece

Other uses
Antigonia (fish), a genus of fish